Marcel Lucien Orfidan (8 April 1897 – 21 August 1979) was a French long jumper. He competed at the 1920 Summer Olympics and finished 14th.

References

1897 births
1979 deaths
French male long jumpers
Athletes (track and field) at the 1920 Summer Olympics
Olympic athletes of France
Sportspeople from Ain